Juvenile primary lateral sclerosis, also known as primary lateral sclerosis (PLSJ), is a very rare genetic disorder, with a small number of reported cases, characterized by progressive weakness and stiffness of muscles in the arms, legs, and face. The disorder damages motor neurons, which are specialized nerve cells in the brain and spinal cord that control muscle movement.

Symptoms and signs

Symptoms of JPLS begin in early childhood and progress over a period of 15 to 20 years. Early symptoms include clumsiness, muscle spasms, weakness and stiffness in the legs, and difficulty with balance. As symptoms progress, they become more serious and include weakness and stiffness in the arms and hands, slurred speech, drooling, difficulty swallowing, and an inability to walk.

Genetics

Juvenile primary lateral sclerosis is inherited in an autosomal recessive pattern, which means two copies of the gene in each cell are altered.  Most often, parents of affected individuals each carry one copy of the altered gene, but do not show any signs or symptoms. 

Mutations in the ALS2 gene, found on chromosome 2, are responsible for causing juvenile primary lateral sclerosis.  The ALS2 gene provides instructions for making a protein called alsin. Alsin is abundant in motor neurons, but its function is not fully understood.  Mutations in the ALS2 gene in this disorder disrupt the instructions for producing alsin. As a result, alsin is unstable and decays rapidly, or it is disabled and cannot function properly. It is currently unknown how the loss of functional alsin protein causes the death of motor neurons and the symptoms of juvenile primary lateral sclerosis.

Diagnosis

Treatment
Treatment of ALS2-related disorders includes physical therapy and occupational therapy to promote mobility and independence and use of computer technologies and devices to facilitate writing and voice communication.

See also 
 List of genetic disorders

References

External links 

Systemic atrophies primarily affecting the central nervous system
Autosomal recessive disorders
Motor neuron diseases
Rare diseases